Fabio Di Giannantonio (born 10 October 1998) is an Italian Grand Prix motorcycle racer, riding for Gresini Racing in MotoGP.

Career

Early career
Born in Rome, in 2015 Di Giannantonio finished as the runner-up in the Red Bull MotoGP Rookies Cup, where he had debuted the year before, and in the CIV Moto3 championship;

Moto3 World Championship

Gresini Racing Moto3 (2015–2016)
In the same year he made his Grand Prix debut in the Moto3 World Championship with the Gresini Racing team at the Valencian Grand Prix as the replacement for the injured Andrea Locatelli, finishing the race in 23rd place.

For 2016 he was signed by the same team as a full-time rider in the same class. At the sixth race of the season, at Mugello, Di Giannantonio achieved his first championship points and his first podium finish with a second place, starting a streak of top ten finishes—including two more podiums, another second place at Assen and a third place in Brno.

Del Conca Gresini Moto3 (2017–2018)

Moto2 World Championship

Speed Up Racing (2019–2020)

Federal Oil Gresini Moto2 (2021)

MotoGP World Championship

Gresini Racing MotoGP (2022–)

Career statistics

Red Bull MotoGP Rookies Cup

Races by year
(key) (Races in bold indicate pole position, races in italics indicate fastest lap)

Grand Prix motorcycle racing

By season

By class

Races by year
(key) (Races in bold indicate pole position, races in italics indicate fastest lap)

References

External links

1998 births
Living people
Italian motorcycle racers
Moto3 World Championship riders
Sportspeople from Rome
Moto2 World Championship riders
MotoGP World Championship riders
Gresini Racing MotoGP riders
21st-century Italian people